The presence of people from Equatorial Guinea in Spain dates back to the 1990s.

Numbers
As of 2019, in Spain, there are 13,737 regular immigrants from Equatorial Guinea. The five cities with the most people from Equatorial Guinea are: Benidorm, Marbella, Valencia, Barcelona and Málaga.

Notable people from Equatorial Guinean in Spain

See also
 Spanish immigration to Equatorial Guinea
 Arabs in Spain
 Afro-Spaniards
 Black people in Spain

References       

African diaspora in Spain
Ethnic groups in Spain
Muslim communities in Europe